Yigal Ravid (born 13 August 1957) is an Israeli radio and television presenter, he hosted the 1999 Eurovision Song Contest following the victory of Dana International the year before.  Ravid is currently employed by Channel 1; additionally he reports on current affairs for the European Broadcasting Union.

Early life
Yigal Ravid, was born in Tel Aviv, Israel in 1957.  He was a student at the Tel-Aviv Herzeliya High School.  Ravid then attended the Tel Aviv University, where he studied Political Science achieving an undergraduate in Bachelor of Arts.  Yigal enrolled with the young journalists' scheme after he received a scholarship at the John Kennedy Foundation.  He continued his education at the University of New York where he studied for a Master of Arts degree in communications.

Yigal's began his professional journalism with the Galei Tzahal, a nationwide Israeli army radio network operated by the Israel Defense Forces.  Between 1983 and 1989 Ravid continued his journalism career as a newsreader working for Kol Yisrael, public domestic and international radio service, operated as a division of the Israel Broadcasting Authority.  It was during this time that he also presented a music show on the Israeli radio station, Reshet Gimel.

Before returning as an editor and newsreader for Kol Yisrael in 1993, Yigal worked for Israel Radio International as a journalist while undergoing further educational studies in America.  In 1996 he continued his newsreader career for Israeli network Channel 1, where he then switched channels in 1998 and presented news programs for Channel 2.  Yigal is fluent in many languages including English, French, and German, as well as his native tongue Hebrew.

Eurovision Song Contest
Yigal has appeared twice at the Eurovision Song Contest.  In 1998 he presented the Israeli televotes.  Ravid returned to the Eurovision stage the year after when he was a co-host at the Eurovision Song Contest 1999 along with Dafna Dekel and Sigal Shachmon.

Career

Radio

Television

See also
 List of Eurovision Song Contest presenters
 Eurovision Song Contest 1999
 Israel Broadcasting Authority

References

1941 births
Living people
Israeli television presenters
Israeli journalists

Tel Aviv University alumni
Israeli people of Romanian-Jewish descent